V. M. Salgaocar College of Law is a private law school situated at Miramar in Panji in the Indian state of Goa. It It offers 3 years LL.B., 5 years integrated Law course and LL.M. which is approved by Bar Council of India (BCI), New Delhi and affiliated to Goa University.

History
V. M. Salgaocar College of Law was established in 1973 by the Devi Sharvani Education Society. Initially the college was known as the Mahadevrao Salgaocar College of Law. In 1997 the college was renamed as V. M. Salgaocar College of Law.

References 

Law schools in Goa
Educational institutions established in 1973
1973 establishments in Goa, Daman and Diu
Universities and colleges in Goa
Education in North Goa district